"On and On" (lit. "I'm Ready to Get Hurt") is a song recorded by South Korean idol group VIXX. It was released physically and as a digital single on January 17, 2013 through Jellyfish Entertainment. The song served as VIXX's third single. "On and On" was composed by Jellyfish Entertainment CEO Hwang Se-jun, Albi Albertsson, Ricky Hanley and Kirstine Lind. It was written by lyricist Kim Eana, with the rap being written by Ravi.

The song's music video was directed by Song Won Young.

Release

The third single album, On and On was released on January 17.

Track listing
The credits are adapted from the official homepage of the group.

Credits and personnel
VIXX - vocals
Cha Hakyeon (N) - Lead vocals, background vocals
Jung Taekwoon (Leo) - Main vocals, background vocals
Lee Jaehwan (Ken) - Main vocals, background vocals
Kim Wonsik (Ravi) - rap, songwriting
Lee Hongbin - vocals
Han Sanghyuk (Hyuk) - vocals
Kim Eana - songwriting
Hwang Se Jun - producer, music
Albi Albertsson - producer, music
Ricky Hanley - producer, music
Kristine Lind - producer, music

Chart performance

Release history

References

External links
 On and On - Single on iTunes

VIXX songs
2013 songs
Korean-language songs
Songs with lyrics by Kim Eana
Jellyfish Entertainment singles